The trap was a shooting sports event held as part of the Shooting at the 1984 Summer Olympics programme. The competition was held between July 29 and 31, 1984 at the shooting ranges in Los Angeles. 70 shooters from 42 nations competed. Each nation was limited to two shooters. The event was won by Luciano Giovannetti of Italy, the first person to successfully defend an Olympic title in the trap. It was Italy's fifth victory in the event, most among nations. Giovannetti's win required winning a three-way shoot-off for the medal positions. Francisco Boza of Peru came second in that shoot-off, taking silver to earn Peru's first trap medal. Daniel Carlisle of the United States finished third for bronze.

Background
This was the 14th appearance of the men's ISSF Olympic trap event. The event was held at every Summer Olympics from 1896 to 1924 (except 1904, when no shooting events were held) and from 1952 to 2016. As with most shooting events, it was nominally open to women from 1968 to 1980; the trap remained open to women through 1992. Very few women participated these years. The event returned to being men-only for 1996, though the new double trap had separate events for men and women that year. In 2000, a separate women's event was added and it has been contested at every Games since. There was also a men's team trap event held four times from 1908 to 1924.

Three of the top 10 shooters from the 1980 Games returned: gold medalist Luciano Giovannetti of Italy and the Spanish team, fifth-place finisher Eladio Vallduvi and tenth-place finisher Ricardo Sancho. Vallduvi and Giovannetti had split the World Championship in 1982. Reigning (1983) World Champion John Primrose of Canada also competed in Los Angeles, while 1981 winner Aleksandr Asanov of the Soviet Union could not enter due to the Soviet-led boycott.

Bahrain, Cyprus, Hong Kong, and Paraguay each made their debut in the event. Great Britain made its 13th appearance, most among nations, having missed only the 1980 Moscow Games.

Competition format
The competition used the 200-target format introduced with the return of trap to the Olympics in 1952. Only a single round of shooting was done, with all shooters facing 200 targets. Shooting was done in 8 series of 25 targets. The first three series (75 shots) were on day 1, the next three (75 shots) on day 2, and the final two series (50 shots) on day 3. Shoot-offs of 25 shots were used as necessary to break ties for medals; ties for the rest of the top 10 places were broken by score in the 8th series (and, if necessary, 7th series and so on until the tie was broken).

Records
Prior to this competition, the existing world and Olympic records were as follows. 

No new world or Olympic records were set during the competition.

Schedule

Results
The three-way tie for the medals was broken with a 25-target shoot-off. Giovannetti, the defending champion, won with a score of 24. Boza hit 23, while Carlisle hit 22.

References

Shooting at the 1984 Summer Olympics
1984 Trap
Trap at the Olympics